Khosrow is a village in Jamalabad Rural District, Sharifabad District, Pakdasht County, Tehran Province, Iran. At the 2006 census, its population was 897, in 246 families.

References 

Populated places in Pakdasht County